Black rice refers to a range of rice types that are colored black.

Black rice may also refer to:

Arròs negre, a Valencian and Catalan dish made with cuttlefish (or squid) and rice, somewhat similar to seafood paella
Arroz negro (Mexican cuisine), a Mexican dish made with rice, in which its dark color comes from black bean broth